The 2005 Wisconsin Badgers football team represented the University of Wisconsin–Madison during the 2005 NCAA Division I-A football season.  Led by Barry Alvarez, the Badgers completed the season with a 10–3 record, including a 5–3 mark in the Big Ten Conference, good for a third-place tie with Michigan, Northwestern and Iowa.

Schedule

Roster

Game Summaries

Bowling Green

Temple

North Carolina

#14 Michigan

Indiana

Northwestern

#22 Minnesota

Purdue

Illinois

#10 Penn State

Iowa

Hawaii

#7 Auburn

Regular starters

Team players selected in the 2006 NFL Draft

References

Wisconsin
Wisconsin Badgers football seasons
Citrus Bowl champion seasons
Wisconsin Badgers football